Fentale is a stratovolcano located in Awash National Park which was found in the Oromia Region, Ethiopia. It is the highest point of Fentale woreda.

Philip Briggs describes Mount Fentale as being crowned by a 350  meter deep crater. Briggs concludes that this volcano "is responsible for the bleak hundred-year-old lava flows that cross the road immediately west of Metehara, and its steam vents can sometimes be seen displaying from the surrounding plains at night."

The date of these eruptions is fixed by the investigations of the early 19th-century explorer William Cornwallis Harris, whom David Buxton states first encountered this volcano and its lava beds in 1842. By questioning the natives, Harris concluded that the most recent eruptions had taken place 30  years before his arrival.

See also
 List of volcanoes in Ethiopia
 List of stratovolcanoes

Footnotes

References 

Fentale
Fentale
Ethiopian Highlands
Geography of Oromia Region
Calderas of Ethiopia